Adrián Blas Taffarel (born 10 January 1966) is an Argentine football manager and former player who played as a forward. He is the current manager of Newell's Old Boys' youth setup.

Playing career
A Newell's Old Boys youth graduate, Taffarel made his first team debut in September 1988, and was a part of the squad which won the 1990–91 Argentine Primera División, even though he ended the campaign at Chaco For Ever. In 1991, he joined Ferro Carril Oeste also in the top tier, and played for a brief period for Banfield in 1993.

In 1995, after a year with Gimnasia y Tiro, Taffarel moved abroad and joined Mexican side Irapuato. In 1997, he played in the Primera B de Chile for O'Higgins before returning to his home country with Argentino de Rosario. He retired in 1998, aged 32.

Managerial career
Immediately after retiring Taffarel took up coaching, being manager of CA San Martín de Chovet before returning to Newell's in 1999, as a youth coach. He was also a manager of former side Argentino de Rosario in 2002, and was in charge of CR Unión y Cultura de Murphy in 2001 to 2004 and in 2016, Jorge Newbery de Comodoro Rivadavia in 2013, back at San Martín in 2015 and Club Sportivo María Teresa in 2018.

Taffarel returned to Newell's and their youth categories in 2019. On 18 October 2021, after Fernando Gamboa was sacked, he was named interim manager until the end of the tournament.

References

External links

1966 births
Living people
Footballers from Rosario, Santa Fe
Argentine footballers
Association football forwards
Argentine Primera División players
Newell's Old Boys footballers
Chaco For Ever footballers
Ferro Carril Oeste footballers
Club Atlético Banfield footballers
Gimnasia y Tiro footballers
Argentino de Rosario footballers
Irapuato F.C. footballers
O'Higgins F.C. footballers
Argentine football managers
Argentine Primera División managers
Newell's Old Boys managers